Polopeustis is a genus of snout moths described by Émile Louis Ragonot in 1893.

Species
Polopeustis altensis (Wocke, 1862)
Polopeustis arctiella (Gibson, 1920)

References

Phycitini
Pyralidae genera
Taxa named by Émile Louis Ragonot